Émilie Contat (1770–1846), was a French stage actress.

She was engaged at the Comédie-Française in 1784.

She became a Sociétaires of the Comédie-Française in 1784.

Her sister Louise Contat was also an actress. She retired in 1815.

References 

1770 births
1846 deaths
18th-century French actresses
French stage actresses